Sir Christopher Peyton (died 1612) was an English lawyer known for his service in Ireland where he oversaw the Peyton Survey, a preliminary investigation in preparation for the Plantation of Munster. He was made Auditor General of Ireland, and knighted by James I for his service. He was the younger son of Christopher Peyton of St Edmundsbury; his mother, Joanna (Mildmay) Peyton, was the sister of Sir Walter Mildmay, Chancellor of the Exchequer.

He married Anne Palmer, daughter of William Palmer of Warwickshire and had three daughters, Anne, Cicely and Thomasine. Through Anne and her second husband, the third  Sir Henry Colley of Castle Carbury, he was the ancestor of the Duke of Wellington. Thomasine married firstly Captain Peter  Castillion, a younger son of the Italian-born courtier Giovanni Battista Castiglione, and secondly Sir Robert Pigott of Desart.

References

Bibliography
Betham, William  The Baronetage of England  Ipswich 1801  Vol. 1
 MacCarthy-Morrogh, Michael. The Munster Plantation: English Migration to Southern Ireland, 1583-1641. Clarendon Press, 1986.

People of Elizabethan Ireland
17th-century Irish lawyers
English emigrants to Ireland
1612 deaths
16th-century English lawyers